The maroon-breasted philentoma (Philentoma velata) is a bird species. They are now usually assigned to the Vangidae.
It is found in Brunei, Indonesia, Malaysia, Myanmar, Singapore, and Thailand.
Its natural habitats are subtropical or tropical moist lowland forests and subtropical or tropical swamps.
It is threatened by habitat loss.

References

maroon-breasted philentoma
Birds of Malesia
maroon-breasted philentoma
Taxonomy articles created by Polbot